Michael Osborne may refer to:

 Michael Osborne (cricketer) (born 1932), English cricketer
 Mike Osborne (1941–2007), English jazz musician
 Michael Osborne (actor) (born 1947), British television actor
 Michael J. Osborne (born 1949), American author, entrepreneur and energy policymaker
 Michael Osborne (footballer) (born 1982), Australian rules footballer